Konari (also Romanized as Konārī and Kenari; also known as Kināri) is a village in Abkosh Rural District, Bord Khun District, Deyr County, Bushehr Province, Iran. At the 2006 census, its population was 342, in 67 families.

References 

Populated places in Deyr County